Robert E. Kay (August 3, 1916 – January 24, 1990) was an American Republican Party politician who served in the New Jersey State Senate and in the New Jersey General Assembly.  

He was a graduate of Duke University and the South Jersey Law School.  He served in the U.S. Air Force during World War II.  Kay was elected to the State Assembly in 1953, representing Cape May County, New Jersey, and was re-elected in 1955 and 1957.  He did not seek re-election in 1959, but was again elected in 1963.  He was not a candidate for re-election in 1965.  Kay was elected State Senator in 1967, narrowly defeating Democrat Robert Halpin by a 51%-49% margin.  He did not run for a second term in 1971.

References

1916 births
1990 deaths
Politicians from Cape May County, New Jersey
Republican Party New Jersey state senators
Republican Party members of the New Jersey General Assembly
Duke University alumni
Rutgers School of Law–Camden alumni
United States Army Air Forces personnel of World War II
20th-century American politicians